Timm Golley (born 17 February 1991) is a German professional footballer who plays as a midfielder for Hamborn 07.

Career
On 13 June 2019, Golley joined 1. FC Saarbrücken on a two-year contract. In 2021, he ended his professional football career in order to concentrate on a regular job. He subsequently joined sixth tier side Hamborn 07.

References

External links

1991 births
Living people
German footballers
Association football midfielders
2. Bundesliga players
3. Liga players
Fortuna Düsseldorf II players
Fortuna Düsseldorf players
FSV Frankfurt players
SV Wehen Wiesbaden players
FC Viktoria Köln players
1. FC Saarbrücken players
Hamborn 07 players